Recycle Rush was the 2015 FIRST Robotics Competition game. It involves picking up and stacking totes on scoring platforms, putting pool noodles ("litter") inside recycling containers, and putting the containers on top of scoring stacks of totes. There is also a coopertition aspect of the game where both alliances of teams can pool their totes and stack them on a step dividing the field to each gain twenty points. Along with these robot actions, human players can attempt to throw the pool noodles across the field to gain four points for each noodle left in the opposing alliance's work zone.

Kickoff
The Kickoff event was held on January 3, 2015.

Autonomous
The game begins with a 15-second period where robots must act on their own according to instructions from programming. During this period, alliances can gain 4 points if each robot moves into the Auto Zone, 6 points if they bring all three totes into the Auto Zone, 8 points if they bring all three barrels into the Auto Zone, and 20 if all three totes are stacked in the Auto Zone. However, the strategy most often seen at regional events and the championship was often to grab the recycling bins located on the step in the middle of the field to "cap" the stacks during the teleoperated period.

Teleoperation
Immediately after the autonomous round, drivers operate the robots via control stations at the ends of the field. During this time, they aim to use the robots to put "litter", represented by green pool noodles, in a Landfill Zone for 1 point apiece, place totes on a scoring platform for 2 points apiece, place litter inside barrels for 6 points per barrel, and put the barrels on top of scoring stacks of totes for 4 points per level (approximately one level per tote) measured from the lowest point of the barrel.

Events

Week 1

Week 2

Week 3

Week 4

Week 5

Week 6

Week 7

World Championship

References 

FIRST Robotics Competition games
2015 in robotics